Bennies Hill Road Bridge is an iron bowstring arch bridge over Catoctin Creek near Middletown, Maryland, United States. It is one of two remaining bridges of its type in Maryland that remain in their original locations.  The bridge was restored in 2009.

References

External links
, including photo in 2004, at Maryland Historical Trust

Road bridges on the National Register of Historic Places in Maryland
Bridges in Frederick County, Maryland
King Bridge Company
National Register of Historic Places in Frederick County, Maryland
Tied arch bridges in the United States